Horacio Zeballos was the defending champion but decided not to participate.
Thomaz Bellucci won the title over Diego Sebastián Schwartzman

Seeds

Draw

Finals

Top half

Bottom half

References
 Main Draw
 Qualifying Draw

2013 ATP Challenger Tour
2013 Singles
2013 in Uruguayan tennis